Newspapers in the United States have traditionally endorsed candidates for party nomination and President. See:

Primaries
 Newspaper endorsements in the 2008 United States presidential primaries
 Newspaper endorsements in the 2012 United States presidential primaries
 Newspaper endorsements in the 2016 United States presidential primaries
 Newspaper endorsements in the 2020 United States presidential primaries

General elections
 Newspaper endorsements in the 1900 United States presidential election
 Newspaper endorsements in the 1904 United States presidential election
 Newspaper endorsements in the 1992 United States presidential election
 Newspaper endorsements in the 1996 United States presidential election
 Newspaper endorsements in the 2004 United States presidential election
 Newspaper endorsements in the 2008 United States presidential election
 Newspaper endorsements for John McCain in the 2008 United States presidential election
 Newspaper endorsements for Barack Obama in the 2008 United States presidential election
 Newspaper endorsements in the 2012 United States presidential election
 Newspaper endorsements in the 2016 United States presidential election
 Newspaper endorsements in the 2020 United States presidential election

External links
 The American Presidency Project: 2016 General Election Editorial Endorsements by Major Newspapers
 The American Presidency Project: 2012 General Election Editorial Endorsements by Major Newspapers
 The American Presidency Project: 2008 General Election Editorial Endorsements by Major Newspapers
 George Washington University: National Endorsements--Newspapers
 Presidential Race - Editorial Endorsements on About.com

Election